Wohlfahrt or Wohlfart is a surname, and may refer to:

 Franz Wohlfahrt (composer) (1833–1884), German violin teacher
 Franz Wohlfahrt (footballer) (born 1964), Austrian footballer
 Hans-Wilhelm Müller-Wohlfahrt (born 1942), a German sport medicine specialist
 Harald Wohlfahrt (born 1953), German chef
 Joseph Wohlfart (1920-2000), Luxembourgian politician
 Käthe Wohlfahrt, a German retailer of Christmas decorations
 Michael Wohlfahrt (1687–1741), American religious leader

See also 
 Wolfarth

ko:복지